Eleanore Cammack "Cammie" King (August 5, 1934 – September 1, 2010) was an American former actress and public relations officer. She is best known for her portrayal of Bonnie Blue Butler in Gone with the Wind (1939). She also provided the voice for the doe Faline as a fawn in the animated Disney film, Bambi (1942).

Early life and family
King was born in Los Angeles, California, on August 5, 1934. Her parents were W. Cammack King, a chemical plant manager, and Eleanore King, a schoolteacher. Her older sister, Diane, was a child actress. Her parents divorced a few years after the filming of Gone With the Wind. Her mother then married Herbert Kalmus, co-founder of Technicolor, in 1949.

Acting career
Though King's acting career only spanned years, she appeared in two of the biggest films of the era, Gone with the Wind and Bambi. She landed the part of Bonnie Blue Butler in Gone With the Wind at the age of four, after casting directors had tested 250 applicants for the role, including her seven-year-old sister Diane. After Diane was deemed too old for the part, she told the staff, "My sister looks like me and is only four and she can read lines". Cammie did remember her lines, but she was unable to keep her eyelids from moving during Bonnie's death scene and was fitted with a death mask. An adult male little person served as a body double for Bonnie's fall from the horse.

Cammie provided the voice of Faline as a fawn in Disney's 1942 film Bambi. According to the Los Angeles Times, she was cast in a third role in the early 1940s but broke out with chicken pox on the day filming began and was dropped from the cast list. Reflecting on her film career, she once joked, "I peaked at 5".

Education and later career
King studied at Marymount High School and went on to attend the University of Southern California, graduating in 1956 with a bachelor's degree in communications. Afterwards she worked as a production assistant on Climax!, a CBS-TV anthology series.

In 1980, she moved to Northern California and had a long public-relations career that included working for the Mendocino Coast Chamber of Commerce.
In the early 2000s, King made a guest appearance as a contestant on the TV game show To Tell the Truth, hosted by John O'Hurley. She spent 40 years working as a marketing coordinator for the Fort Bragg-Mendocino Coast Chamber of Commerce.

King often appeared at retrospectives with the surviving Gone With the Wind cast members. In 2009, she privately published a small book, Bonnie Blue Butler: A Gone With the Wind Memoir, mainly selling copies directly to fans via personal appearances and the internet.

Personal life
She married Walter "Ned" Pollock in 1957. Together they adopted two children, Matthew and Katharine. Pollock died of cancer in 1968. She then married Michael W Conlon in 1971, and he adopted her two children. She and Conlon divorced in 1975. 
Her father-in-law from her second marriage, Judd Conlon, was a musical arranger for many Disney films including Alice in Wonderland (1951) and Peter Pan (1953).

King died on September 1, 2010, at her home in Fort Bragg, California, at age 76, from lung cancer.

Filmography

References

External links

 
 
Cammie King Conlon obituary
 Obituary: Cammie King Conlon dies at 76; actress played Bonnie Blue Butler in 'Gone With the Wind' - latimes.com
Interview, biography and photos

1934 births
2010 deaths
American child actresses
Actresses from Los Angeles
Deaths from lung cancer in California
Burials at Holy Cross Cemetery, Culver City
20th-century American actresses
People from Fort Bragg, California
21st-century American women